Justin Ingram (born December 21, 1998) is an American soccer player who currently plays for Las Vegas Lights in the USL Championship.

Career

Youth
Ingram was part of the Carmel United side that won three Indiana State Championships. Ingram was also part of the Indiana Fire Academy. Ingram also spent time with the United States under-15 and United States under-19 teams.

College and amateur
In 2018, Ingram attended the University of Virginia to play college soccer, but struggled for playing time in his two seasons with the Cavaliers, making only eight appearances. In 2019, Ingram transferred to Loyola University Maryland, where he found success over his 44 appearances, scoring 13 goals and adding 18 assists to his name. He achieved accolades including All-Patriot League Second Team in 2019, was a two-time All-Patriot League First Team, a two-time Patriot League All-Tournament Team, a two-time Patriot League Midfielder of the Year, and was a two-time United Soccer Coaches First Team All-Atlantic Region selection.

In 2018, Ingram played with NPSL side FC Indiana during the team struggled to a 0–0–12 record. During his 2019 season, Ingram appeared for USL League Two side Flint City Bucks, helping the team become the 2019 USL League Two season champions with six appearances over the regular season and playoffs, scoring a single goal.

Professional
On January 11, 2022, Ingram was selected 48th overall in the 2022 MLS SuperDraft by Inter Miami. However, he was not signed by the club. On February 15, 2022, it was announced that Ingram had joined USL Championship club Indy Eleven. He made his professional debut on March 12, 2022, starting against Loudoun United. He was released by Indy Eleven on November 30, 2022, following the conclusion of the 2022 season.

Ingram was announced as a new signing for USL Championship side Las Vegas Lights on January 25, 2023.

Honors

Club
Flint City Bucks
USL League Two: 2019

References

External links
Virginia bio
Loyola-Maryland bio
Indy Eleven bio

1998 births
Living people
American soccer players
Association football midfielders
Flint City Bucks players
Indy Eleven players
Inter Miami CF draft picks
Las Vegas Lights FC players
Loyola Greyhounds men's soccer players
National Premier Soccer League players
Soccer players from Indianapolis
United States men's youth international soccer players
USL Championship players
USL League Two players
Virginia Cavaliers men's soccer players